The slender squirrel (Sundasciurus tenuis) is a species of rodent in the family Sciuridae. It is arboreal and found in Indonesia, Singapore, Malaysia, and Thailand. The body is brown on the upper parts and light grey on the underparts. The body measures about 13–16 cm, with a slightly shorter slender tail. It feeds on soft bark, fruits and insects.

References

Ecology Asia photos and description

Sundasciurus
Rodents of Singapore
Rodents of Thailand
Rodents of Indonesia
Rodents of Malaysia
Mammals of Brunei
Mammals described in 1824
Taxonomy articles created by Polbot